The Charles J. Kimmel (DE-584) was a Rudderow class destroyer escort serving in the US Navy from 1944 through 1947.  She served in both the Atlantic and Pacific theaters of World War II. The Kimmel was laid down by Bethlehem Steel in Hingham MA on 1 December 1943 and launched on 15 January 1944, she was commissioned 20 April 1944
Decommissioned 15 January 1947, stricken 30 June 1968 and ultimately sunk as target off California, 13 November 1969.

Namesake
Charles Jack Kimmel was born on 2 July 1918 in Rushsylvania, Ohio. He enlisted in the United States Marine Corps 29 October 1941 and was commissioned as a Second lieutenant on 31 January 1942. He was killed in action near the Matanikau River on Guadalcanal on 2 November 1942 while leading his platoon in a bayonet charge. He was posthumously awarded the Navy Cross.

Atlantic Duty
The USS Charles J. Kimmel escorted coastwise convoys between Norfolk, VA., and New York City until August 1944. On 2 August she sailed to guard the passage of a convoy to Oran, where she was ordered to sail independently escorting a transport to Naples, both of these movements in support of the recent assault on southern France. She rejoined her original escort group at Oran on 26 August, and returned to Boston, MA 18 September. Here she received repairs, and Pacific-type camouflage.

Pacific duty
The Kimmel transited the Panama Canal arriving at Manus 7 November 1944. On 20 November, she sailed for Hollandia to join the group escorting a reinforcement convoy to Leyte. She returned to New Guinea to prepare for the assault on Lingayen. On 28 December she put to sea as part of the San Fabian Attack Force, coming under air attack with her force on 6, 7, and 8 January 1945 as the huge amphibious fleet sailed north. Her guns joined the antiaircraft barrage shielding the vulnerable transports and landing craft then and during the assault on 9 January.

The Charles J. Kimmel continued to operate in the Philippines though the remainder of the war, escorting convoys from New Guinea to Leyte and Lingayen as well as within the Philippine Archipelago. Twice she screened shipping to the Palaus.

From 2 June, she served with the local naval defense force in Davao Gulf, providing communications for naval forces ashore as well as performing air-sea rescue missions. On the first day of her new assignment, she dashed under the guns of enemy-held Auqui Island to rescue 22 survivors of a downed Air Force transport. The Kimmel aided Filipino troops in their mop-up activities by bombarding Piso Point to dislodge approximately 600 Japanese soldiers.

In September 1945, the Charles J. Kimmel escorted a convoy to Okinawa, returning to patrol duties in the Philippines until 29 November, when she hoisted the homeward-bound pennant at Samar. She arrived in San Diego 18 December 1945, and there was placed out of commission in reserve 15 January 1947.

The USS Charles J. Kimmel received one battle star for World War II service.

Military awards and honors

External links
http://www.navsource.org/archives/06/584.htm
http://www.hazegray.org/danfs/escorts/de584.htm

References

Rudderow-class destroyer escorts
Shipwrecks of the California coast
Ships built in Hingham, Massachusetts
1944 ships